Mirbelia viminalis is a species of flowering plant in the family Fabaceae and is endemic to northern Australia. It is an erect to spreading, spiny, leafless shrub with yellow flowers.

Description
The flowers are similar to those of M. ramulosa except that the bracteoles are close to the base of the sepals. the outer surface of the sepals has hairs pressed against the surface, and the petals are entirely yellow.

Taxonomy
This mirbelia was first formally described in 1837 by George Bentham in Commentationes de Leguminosarum Generibus from an unpublished description by Allan Cunningham who gave it the name Jacksonia viminalis. In 1930, Charles Gardner changed the name to Mirbelia viminalis in Enumeratio Plantarum Australiae Occidentalis. The specific epithet (viminalis) means "having long, thin branches".

Distribution and habitat
Mirbelia viminalis grows on rocky outcropes, scree slopes and hills and is widespread in the north of Western Australia, the Northern Territory and northern Queensland.

Conservation status
Mirbelia viminalis is listed as "not threatened" by the Government of Western Australia Department of Biodiversity, Conservation and Attractions, and as of "least concern" in the Northern Territory and Queensland.

References

Mirbelioids
viminalis
Fabales of Australia
Flora of Western Australia
Flora of the Northern Territory
Flora of Queensland
Plants described in 1837
Taxa named by George Bentham